Weingart Stadium (formerly East Los Angeles College Stadium or ELAC Stadium) is a 22,355-capacity multi-purpose stadium located at East Los Angeles College, in Monterey Park, California. It was built in 1951 at a cost of $3.1 million, and following renovations in 1984 it was renamed after philanthropist Ben Weingart.

Sports

Football
Weingart is the home of the East Los Angeles College football team, but is probably best known as the site of the Garfield High School–Roosevelt High School football game. Also known as the East Los Angeles Classic, the annual clash has resulted in the stadium's largest crowds, numbering over 25,000.

Soccer
The ELAC men's and women's soccer teams have played here since the stadium was built in 1951.

The Los Angeles Aztecs of the old North American Soccer League played its first season at Weingart in 1974. The Aztecs won the Western Division with the league's best record, defeated the Boston Minutemen in the semifinals, 2-0, in front of 5,485 at ELAC, then won the NASL Final over the Miami Toros in Miami. The club would eventually move to larger stadia such as the Rose Bowl and the Los Angeles Memorial Coliseum, but never won another championship before folding after the 1981 season.

The Los Angeles Salsa of the APSL called Weingart home for some of their games in 1993-94. (The Salsa hosted the 1993 APSL Championship Game, but at Titan Stadium in Fullerton.) It is one of the few mid-size stadiums in the western United States retrofitted with a turf playing surface certified by the FIFA.

Field hockey
The stadium played host to all 1984 Olympic field hockey matches; the US women's team took home the bronze medal. Also, US Field Hockey played a home game here in 1990.

Other uses
Commencement ceremonies for local high schools such as Montebello High School, Schurr High School in Montebello, Alhambra High School in Alhambra and Garfield High School in East Los Angeles are held at Weingart Stadium.

Films
In Viva Knievel! it was used to simulate a stadium in Mexico were Evel Knievel did a motorcycle jump. A concert featuring Mexican music was used to draw a crowd in to fill the stadium for the shoot.

In Forrest Gump, special effects were used to turn the stadium into the University of Alabama's football stadium; using movie trickery, a small crowd at ELAC appears to fill the entire stadium.

A portion of the 2005 soccer movie Goal! was filmed at the stadium.

On October 19, 2013, during halftime of a game between ELAC and Victor Valley College, the stadium was used as the home field of Gotham City University for the film Batman v Superman: Dawn of Justice. The scene involved a football game between Gotham City University and rival Metropolis State University.

The stadium was used in the music video for the song "Wishes" by Baltimore dream pop band Beach House.

References

External links
 Weingart Stadium at LA Sports Council
 Weingart Stadium at Google Maps

Cal State Los Angeles Diablos football
College track and field venues in the United States
Defunct college football venues
w
Los Angeles Salsa
Eastside Los Angeles
Sports venues in Los Angeles County, California
Sports in Monterey Park, California
Soccer venues in California
Venues of the 1984 Summer Olympics
Olympic field hockey venues
North American Soccer League (1968–1984) stadiums
Sports venues completed in 1951
1951 establishments in California
Athletics (track and field) venues in California
American football venues in California
High school football venues in California